The Netherlands competed at the 2012 Summer Paralympics in London, United Kingdom, from 29 August to 9 September 2012.

Medalists

Archery

Men

|-
|align=left|Johan Wildeboer
|align=left|Ind. recurve W1/W2
|588
|13
|L 0–6
|colspan=5|Did not advance
|}

Athletics

Men–track

Women–track

Men–field

Women–field

Cycling

Road

Men

Women

Track

Sprint

Time trial

Pursuit

Equestrian

Individual

Team

Football 7-a-side

Group play

5th–8th place semifinal

5th/6th place match

Sailing

X = Due to a lack of wind sailing was cancelled.

Swimming

Men

Women

Table tennis

Volleyball

Women's tournament
Roster

Group play

Semi-final

Bronze medal match

Wheelchair basketball

The Netherlands qualified for the women's team event in wheelchair basketball by finishing fifth at the 2010 Wheelchair Basketball World Championship.

Women's tournament

Quarter-final

Semi-final

Bronze medal match

Wheelchair tennis

See also
Netherlands at the Paralympics
Netherlands at the 2012 Summer Olympics

Notes

Nations at the 2012 Summer Paralympics
2012
Paralympics